General elections were held in Liechtenstein on 3 and 5 March 1989. The result was a victory for the Patriotic Union, which won 13 of the 25 seats in the Landtag, which had been enlarged by 10 seats compared to the 1986 elections. Voter turnout was 90.88%. This was the first and only election contested by the Non-Party List, a political grouping attempting to prevent either the VU or FBP from forming a majority.

Results

References

Liectenstein
1989 in Liechtenstein
Elections in Liechtenstein
March 1989 events in Europe